Chabertia ovina, the large-mouthed bowel worm, is a species of parasitic roundworms that infects sheep, goats (occasionally cattle) and other wild ruminants. Infection of pigs are very infrequent. It is not known to be contagious to humans.

The disease caused by Chabertia worms is called chabertiasis or chabertiosis.

It is found worldwide but is more frequent in temperate regions.

References 

 The parasitic life cycle of Chabertia ovina (Fabricius, 1788) in sheep. RP Herd, International Journal for Parasitology, 1971, 
 The pathogenic importance of Chabertia ovina (Fabricius, 1788) in experimentally infected sheep. RP Herd, International Journal for Parasitology, 1971,

External links 
 Chabertia ovina at cal.vet.upenn.edu
 Chabertia ovina at Fauna Europaea

Sheep and goat diseases
Parasitic nematodes of mammals
Nematodes described in 1794
Strongylida